Enon is an unincorporated community in Nicholas County, West Virginia, United States. Its post office  is closed.

The community most likely was named after Ænon, in Palestine, where John the Baptist baptized the people.

References

Unincorporated communities in Nicholas County, West Virginia
Unincorporated communities in West Virginia